The 2004 Estoril Open was a tennis tournament played on outdoor clay courts at the Estoril Court Central in Oeiras in Portugal that was part of the International Series of the men's 2004 ATP Tour and of Tier IV of the women's 2004 WTA Tour. It was the 15th edition of the tournament for the men (the 8th for the women) and was held from 12 April until 18 April 2004. Juan Ignacio Chela and Émilie Loit won the singles titles.

Finals

Men's singles

 Juan Ignacio Chela defeated  Marat Safin 6–7(2–7), 6–3, 6–3 
 It was Chela's 2nd title of the year and the 4th of his career.

Women's singles

 Émilie Loit defeated  Iveta Benešová 7–5, 7–6(7–1) 
 It was Loit's 3rd title of the year and the 10th of her career.

Men's doubles

 Juan Ignacio Chela /  Gastón Gaudio defeated  František Čermák /  Leoš Friedl 6–2, 6–1
 It was Chela's 3rd title of the year and the 5th of his career. It was Gaudio's 2nd title of the year and the 4th of his career.

Women's doubles

 Emmanuelle Gagliardi /  Janette Husárová defeated  Olga Blahotova /  Gabriela Navrátilová 6–3, 6–2
 It was Gagliardi's 1st title of the year and the 1st of her career. It was Husárová's 2nd title of the year and the 17th of her career.

References

External links
 Official website
 ATP Tournament Profile
 WTA Tournament Profile

Estoril Open
Estoril Open
Portugal Open
Estoril Open
 Estoril Open